State Route 94 (SR 94) is a  state highway in rural northern Hawkins County in the northeastern portion of the U.S. state of Tennessee. SR 94 serves as a connector from SR 66 to SR 70 and provides access to the former town of Pressmen's Home.

Route description
SR 94 begins in rural northern Hawkins County at an intersection with SR 66. During the divided section, SR 94 passes Camelot Country Club and the former town of Pressmen's Home, the former headquarters of the International Printing Pressmen and Assistants Union of North America. Just past Pressmen's Home, the divided section ends and curves around and passes close to Pressmen's Home Lake. The route then becomes more curvy and it meets its eastern terminus, an intersection with SR 70, north of Rogersville.

Major intersections

See also
 
 
 List of state routes in Tennessee

References

094
Transportation in Hawkins County, Tennessee